Amazonía region in southern Colombia comprises the departments of Amazonas, Caquetá, Guainía, Guaviare, Putumayo and Vaupés, and covers an area of 483,000 km², 35% of Colombia's total territory.  The region is mostly covered by tropical rainforest, or jungle, which is a part of the greater Amazon rainforest.

Biogeographical subregions
The region is bounded by the East Andes along the western edge and extends to the Venezuelan and Brazilian borders in the east.  The northern limit begins with the Guaviare and Vichada Rivers and extends south to the Putumayo and Amazon Rivers.

The Amazon region is divided up into distinct subregions:
 Amazon foothills:  bordering the East Andes
 Caquetá River Plain: the main watershed of this region
 Inírida River Plain: location of the famous Cerros de Mavecure
 Guaviare River Plain: shared with the Eastern Plains
 Putumayo River Plain: along the southern border
 Serranía de Chiribiquete
 Amazon Trapezium:  the area of land that actually borders with the Amazon River

Other important rivers include the Vaupés, Apaporis and Yarí.

Biodiversity 

The tropical rainforest classified more specifically as a tropical moist broadleaf forest.  Within the Colombian Amazon region there are five moist forest ecoregions:
 Caquetá moist forests:  the largest part of the Colombian Amazon region centered on the Caquetá, Vaupés, Yarí, and Apaporis Rivers
 Napo moist forests:  the southwest corner of the Colombian Amazon region which borders the Andes and includes the headwaters of the Caquetá and Putumayo Rivers
 Solimões-Japurá moist forests: in Colombia this ecoregion is centered on the Putumayo and Amazon Rivers
 Japurá-Solimões-Negro moist forests:  this ecoregion barely extends into Colombia mainly around the Lower Vaupés and Negro Rivers
 Campinarana:  this ecoregion of white sandy forest and swamps barely extends into Colombia around the Negro River in the Department of Vaupés

Protected areas

 PNN Alto Fragua Indi-Wasi
 PNN Amacayacu
 PNN Cahuinarí
 PNN Serranía de Chiribiquete
 RNN Nukak
 PNN La Paya
 RNN Puinawai
 PNN ío Puré
 PNN Serranía de los Churumbelos Auka-Wasi
 PNN Tinigua
 PNN Yaigojé Apaporis

See also
Amazonas (Colombian department)
Territorial Environmental Information System of the Colombian Amazon

External links 

Territorial-Environmental Information System of Colombian Amazon SIAT-AC website

References

Amazon rainforest
Natural regions of Colombia
Amazon basin